Charles Dunn Harrison (August 17, 1949 – April 13, 2020) was an American college basketball coach who served as head coach at the University of New Mexico and East Carolina University. 

A graduate of Guilford College, Harrison began his coaching career as a graduate assistant for Bob Knight at Indiana. He then held assistant positions with Clemson, Oklahoma and the National Basketball Association's Buffalo Braves.

In 1979, following a second stint at Oklahoma, Harrison was hired as an assistant at New Mexico under head coach Norm Ellenberger. However, right before the team’s season opener Ellenberger was suspended and later fired following the revelation of an academic fraud scandal nicknamed “Lobogate.” Harrison was tapped as the new head coach and led the depleted team to a 6–22 record. Following the season he was replaced by the more seasoned Gary Colson.

After a two-year stint as an assistant at Iowa State under Johnny Orr, Harrison was named head coach at East Carolina (ECU). He led the Pirates for five seasons, compiling a record of 51–90. In January, 1987, Harrison announced he would step down from ECU at the close of the season.

Harrison died on April 13, 2020, at age 70.

References

External links
College record @ sports-reference.com

1949 births
2020 deaths
American men's basketball coaches
Basketball coaches from North Carolina
Buffalo Braves assistant coaches
Clemson Tigers men's basketball coaches
College men's basketball head coaches in the United States
Guilford College alumni
East Carolina Pirates men's basketball coaches
Indiana University alumni
Iowa State Cyclones men's basketball coaches
New Mexico Lobos men's basketball coaches
Oklahoma Sooners men's basketball coaches
People from Nash County, North Carolina